Mian Biwi Razi is a 1982 comedy–drama film directed by Sangeeta, written by Iqbal Rizvi and produced by Syed Tayyab Ali.

The film stars Nadeem Baig, Tahira Naqvi, Kaveeta, Agha Sikandar and Saqi. It was released on 29 January 1982, was a box-office hit and ended up being a Platinum Jubilee film of 1982.

This was Tahira Naqvi's last acting role. She died of cancer six months after the film's release.

Cast
Nadeem Baig
Tahira Naqvi
Kaveeta
Agha Sikandar
 Saqi

Soundtrack
The soundtrack of the film consisting of five songs was composed by Kamal Ahmed, and the film songs were sung by Naheed Akhtar, Masood Rana and A. Nayyar.

Songs
 Bhikaran Hun Bhuki Hazar Din Say, Sung by Naheed Akhtar, lyrics by Taslim Fazli
 Ishq Na Dekhay Oonch Neech Ko 
 Mausam Suhana Mausam, Sung by A. Nayyar, lyrics by Saeed Gillani
 Shehri Babu Say Karke Shadi, Main Dekho, Sung by Naheed Akhtar, lyrics by Khawaja Pervez
 Soona Tha Jeevan, Tu Nay Bakhera Rang Pyar Ka, Sung by Naheed Akhtar and A. Nayyar, lyrics by Saeed Gillani

References

External links
 

1982 films
Films directed by Sangeeta (Pakistani actress)
Pakistani comedy-drama films
1982 comedy-drama films
1982 comedy films
1982 drama films
1980s Urdu-language films
Urdu-language Pakistani films